Sterolibacterium is a genus of gram-negative, oxidase- and catalase-positive rod-shaped bacteria from the family of Rhodocyclaceae which belongs to the class of Betaproteobacteria. So far there is only one species known of this genus (Sterolibacterium denitrificans)

References

Rhodocyclaceae
Bacteria genera
Monotypic bacteria genera